Seize the Day is a 1986 television film directed by Fielder Cook. It stars Robin Williams, Jerry Stiller and Joseph Wiseman, and is based on the novel of the same name by Saul Bellow, It was broadcast on the PBS "Great Performances" series in May 1987.

Plot summary
The story is set in 1956. After losing his job as a traveling salesman of children's furniture, Tommy Wilhelm leaves Massachusetts for New York City. He is under financial strain because of the financial demands of his wife, from whom he is separated. He moves into the same hotel housing his physician father, Dr. Adler, with whom he has a strained relationship.

Flashbacks show Tommy's past, how he moved to Los Angeles, changed his name, and tried to become an actor, which failed. His marriage failed because he left his wife, and he is estranged from their two sons.

In New York, Tommy becomes involved with Dr. Tamkin, an acquaintance of his father who speculates in the commodities market. He agrees to open an account managed by Tamkin on a 50-50 basis, but Tamkin persuades Tommy to put up most of the money. When prices decline and Tommy wants to cash in the account, Tamkin urges Tommy to remain calm and seize the day.

The commodities venture collapses, and he has lost his life savings and cannot even pay his hotel bill. His estranged wife is unsympathetic and his father refuses to help him or even provide emotional support. Tommy tries to find Tamkin, who has vanished. He winds up at a stranger's funeral, where he cries and is mistaken for a mourner.

Cast
Robin Williams as Tommy Wilhelm
Jerry Stiller as Dr. Tamkin
Joseph Wiseman as Dr. Adler
Richard B. Shull as Rojax
David Bickford as Son-in-Law
Glenne Headly as Olive
Stephen Strimpell as Stockbroker
Katherine Borowitz as Margaret
John Fiedler as Carl
Jo Van Fleet as Mrs. Einhorn
Allen Swift as Maurice Venice

Production 
Williams' casting in the role was billed as a sharp departure from his previous comic roles, such as the TV series Mork and Mindy, though he had previously appeared in dramatic roles, including The World According to Garp. Williams described it as  "kind of like a Jewish Greek drama." The movie was filmed over a thirty-day period in New York City, longer than most television movies on commercial networks at the time but far shorter than the shooting schedule of a feature film.

The film was blocked from theatrical release by Williams' management company. The San Francisco Examiner reported that the decision was made because the film was not like the comedies for which Williams was known.

Reception 
Philadelphia Inquirer critic Ken Tucker praised the performances but wrote that the film was "a little boring in its relentless depression." The director, he wrote, was "all too willing to let a scene dawdle, the better to emphasize Tommy's torture."

A San Francisco Examiner critic called the film a "powerful drama" and "remarkably faithful reproduction" of the Bellow novel, and praised the performances, calling Williams "first rate."

New York Times critic John J. O'Connor praised Wiseman's performance and said that Stiller "steals the film." But he criticized the casting of Robin Williams as too "Middle American" for a role as a Jewish New Yorker. He wrote that Williams' performance was excessively intense, and that the portrayal of Jewish people whose only yardstick is money is "a scenario calculated to unsettle, possibly even offend."

Writing in New York magazine, critic John Leonard called the film "ugly stuff" but said that Williams "is, for the most part, up to it."

See also
 Carpe diem
Death of a Salesman

References

External links

1986 films
Films directed by Fielder Cook
Films based on American novels
1986 drama films
American drama films
Golan-Globus films
1980s English-language films
1980s American films